Dareshgaft (also Romanized as Dareshkaft; also known as Nebār Kabūd, Benār Kabūd, and Benār Kabūd-e ‘Olyā) is a village in Koregah-e Sharqi Rural District, in the Central District of Khorramabad County, Lorestan Province, Iran. At the 2006 census, its population was 32, in 6 families.

References 

Towns and villages in Khorramabad County